Camplyoneurum xalapense is a species of fern in the family Polypodiaceae. It is apparently found only within Central America, especially in southern Mexico and Guatemala.

References 

 Polypodium xalapense (Fée) Christ, Bull. Soc. Roy. Bot. Belgique. 35(1): 231. 1896. 
 Timothy Plowman, Five new species of Brunfelsia from South America (Solanaceae), Fieldiana. Botany: New Series Volume 8; Pub. no.1322. Field Museum, Chicago, IL, 1981.

xalapense
Ferns of the Americas
Flora of Central America
Flora of Southeastern Mexico
Flora of Guatemala
Flora of the Yucatán Peninsula
Taxa named by Antoine Laurent Apollinaire Fée